Trapped at Sea is the 75th title of the Hardy Boys Mystery Stories, written by Franklin W. Dixon.  It was published by Wanderer Books in 1982.

Plot summary
This book opens with Frank, Joe & Chet being involved in a traffic accident with a Mack truck. As the car is damaged, the drivers of the Mack truck offer the boys a lift to the next town. Unfortunately the truck gets hijacked by a gang and the drivers locked up in the trailer. Later Mr. Hardy tells the boys that there have been a number of hijackings against that firm, the Ortiz Trucking Company, and that he's going to Washington the following day to help the FBI investigate the hijackings.

Initially, Frank, Joe and Chet work undercover as drivers at the Ortiz Trucking Company before Joe finds himself hijacked by one of the gang. Tracking the gang down, Frank, Joe & Chet stow away on a ship named the Mary Malone and find themselves facing the gang, a group of corrupt officials who plan to use nuclear weapons on every major city on Earth to take over the world.

References

External links
Trapped at Sea at Fantastic Fiction

The Hardy Boys books
1982 American novels
1982 children's books